Mark Trahant is the editor-at-large of Indian Country Today, an Indigenous-focused news operation.

Career

Trahant is a former Charles R. Johnson Professor of Journalism at the University of North Dakota. He is a citizen of Idaho’s Shoshone-Bannock Tribe, and a former president of the Native American Journalists Association. Trahant is the former editor of the editorial page for the Seattle Post-Intelligencer, where he chaired the daily editorial board, directed a staff of writers, editors and a cartoonist. He was chairman and chief executive officer at the Robert C. Maynard Institute for Journalism Education.  He is a former columnist at The Seattle Times and has been publisher of the Moscow-Pullman Daily News in Moscow, Idaho; executive news editor of The Salt Lake Tribune; a reporter at the Arizona Republic in Phoenix; and has worked at several tribal newspapers. He was an editor in residence at the University of Idaho. Trahant was a reporter on the PBS series Frontline with a story called "The Silence," about sexual abuse by clergy in Alaska. At the 2004 UNITY conference in Washington, D.C., he asked George W. Bush what the meaning of tribal sovereignty was in the 21st century; Bush replied, "Tribal sovereignty means that. It’s sovereign. You’re a ... you’re a ... you’ve been given sovereignty and you’re viewed as a sovereign entity."

Books

Trahant authored The Last Great Battle of the Indian Wars in 2010.

He authored Pictures of Our Nobler Selves, a history of American Indian contributions to journalism published by The Freedom Forum in 1996.

He authored a commissioned work, The Whole Salmon, published by Idaho’s Sun Valley Center for the Arts.

He co-authored his most recent book, Lewis & Clark Through Indian Eyes, an anthology edited by Alvin Josephy Jr.

Honors and awards

Trahant, as a co-author of a series on federal Indian policy, was a finalist for the 1988 Pulitzer Prize for National Reporting. Trahant’s awards and honors include Best Columnist from the Native American Journalists Association and the Society of Professional Journalists, a Ruhl Fellowship, and co-winner of the Heywood Broun Award. He was a 2009-2010 Kaiser Media Fellow. In 1995 Trahant was a visiting professional scholar at The Freedom Forum's First Amendment Center at Vanderbilt University. He serves as a Trustee of the Diversity Institute, an affiliate of the Freedom Forum, based in Washington, D.C. Trahant was a juror for the Pulitzer Prize in 2004 and 2005.

Personal life

Trahant lives in Grand Forks, North Dakota. He currently teaches in the Communication department at the University of North Dakota.

References

External links
 http://trahantreports.com

Living people
20th-century American male writers
21st-century American male writers
20th-century American non-fiction writers
21st-century American non-fiction writers
20th-century Native Americans
21st-century Native Americans
American editors
American male journalists
Bannock people
Journalists from Montana
Native American journalists
People from Grand Forks, North Dakota
University of Idaho faculty
University of North Dakota faculty
The Salt Lake Tribune people
The Seattle Times people
Year of birth missing (living people)